SM Studios (stylized in all caps) is a South Korean holding company wholly owned by SM Entertainment. It was established after SM restructured its affiliates to focus on its music business. The company manages drama, entertainment, and fields of new media.

History 
On April 5, 2021, SM Entertainment revealed through a public announcement that the company had established a new subsidiary, SM Studios, with SM acquiring 195,648 shares for 244,561.93 million won. SM stated that it planned to focus on the music business, the company's original entertainment business, through restructuring. The wholly-owned subsidiary was established to promote the restructuring of group affiliates to facilitate the business structure. Additionally, the company was set to promote the efficiency of group management through a "reliable" management system. It was also expected to secure market competitiveness as affiliates related to media studios have coordinated agreements through integrated management of drama, entertainment, and new media fields.

SM invested all of its shares in SM Culture & Contents (SM C&C), KeyEast, SM Life Design Group, Dear U, and Mystic Story to SM Studios. During SM Congress 2021, Kim Young-min, chief executive officer (CEO) of SM Studios, stated that the broadcasting system was SM's "big dream" since the establishment of SM Planning in 1989. In May, SM recruited producers and content experts from SM C&C, KeyEast, and Mystic Story to establish SM Studios and produce "SM Original" content. On November 16, 2022, SM Studios premiered its first "global" content, Welcome to NCT Universe.

Subsidiaries 

 Dear U (2021)
 KeyEast (2021)
 Mystic Story (2021)
 SM Culture & Contents (2021)
 SM Life Design Group (2021)

Production works

References 

SM Entertainment subsidiaries
Mass media companies established in 2021
South Korean companies established in 2021
Companies based in Seoul
Entertainment companies of South Korea
Holding companies of South Korea
Mass media companies of South Korea